Turbinicarpus saueri is a species of plant in the family Cactaceae.

It is endemic to San Luis Potosí and Tamaulipas states, located in northeastern Mexico.

Its natural habitat is hot deserts.

Subspecies
, Plants of the World Online accepts the following subspecies, some of which have been treated as separate species:
Turbinicarpus saueri subsp. gonzalezii Pavlícek & Zatloukal
Turbinicarpus saueri subsp. knuthianus (Boed.) Lüthy, syn. Turbinicarpus knuthianus (Boed.) V.John & Ríha
Turbinicarpus saueri subsp. nelissae Halda & Panar., syn. Turbinicarpus ysabelae
Turbinicarpus saueri subsp. nieblae (García-Mor., Mart.-Aval. & Bergm.Beck.) A.Hofer
Turbinicarpus saueri subsp. saueri 
Turbinicarpus saueri subsp. septentrionalis Matusz. & Šnicer
Turbinicarpus saueri subsp. verduzcoi Zachar & Lux

References

Sources

External links
 
 

saueri
Cacti of Mexico
Endemic flora of Mexico
Flora of San Luis Potosí
Flora of Tamaulipas
Vulnerable plants
Endangered biota of Mexico
Taxonomy articles created by Polbot